Shahreza County is in Isfahan province, Iran. The capital of the county is the city of Shahreza. At the 2006 census, the county's population was 139,702 in 38,929 households. The following census in 2011 counted 149,555 people in 44,578 households. At the 2016 census, the county's population was 159,797 in 50,983 households.

Administrative divisions

The population history of Shahreza County's administrative divisions over three consecutive censuses is shown in the following table. The latest census shows one district, four rural districts, and two cities.

References

 

Counties of Isfahan Province